This is a list of all the 30 heads of state and heads of government who have received the Nobel Prize. Excepting Winston Churchill who received the Literature Prize, all the others were awarded with a Peace Prize.

In office

Before or after serving in office

Notes

References 

Leaders
Governments
Lists of heads of government